Scrim can refer to:

 Scrim (material), either of two types of material (a lightweight, translucent fabric or a coarse, heavy material)
 Scrim (lighting), a device used in lighting for films
  Scrim (internet slang), friendly match between teams and clans in various ladders, shorthand for: scrimmage.
 SCRIM, Sideway-force Coefficient Routine Investigation Machine 
 Colin Scrimgeour ("Uncle Scrim", 1903-1987), a New Zealand Methodist minister and broadcaster
 Scott Arceneaux Jr. (known as Scrim), member of New Orleans hip-hop group Suicideboys

See also
Scrim and sarking
Scrimmage (disambiguation)